Anonymouse is an anonymous Swedish artists collective, notable for street installations in Sweden. They build mouse-themed miniatures and display them in public. The first work was the restaurant Il Topolino that appeared on Bergsgatan in Malmö. It was vandalized a few weeks later. In April 2017 they created an amusement park at Södra Förstadsgatan. In September 2017 two shops and a gas station opened in Borås.

The group also built exhibits in Bayonne and on Isle of Man in 2018 and later the same year a miniature barber shop and a shelter for mice in Malmö. In May 2019 a detective agency in Malmö and a website opened, where the public was invited to solve a fictitious case.

Inspired by Anonymouse, Gothenburg artist Staffan Lindholm built and displayed on the streets of Haga, Gothenburg a mouse-themed cheese shop, a shoe shop, a motorcycle shop and a gym.

References

External links
 on Instagram
Anonymouse MMX on Facebook 

Swedish artist groups and collectives
Multimedia artists